Orchard Bay is a small bay with sand and shingle beach on the south-east coast of the Isle of Wight, England. It lies to the south-west of the Ventnor Botanic Garden and just along the coast west from Steephill Cove.

The bay can be accessed by a small footpath at the western end of the bay. The beach is dominated by a large seawall and Orchard House just above the high water mark. Orchard bay House was originally built in 1828 as three coastguard cottages in order to prevent smuggling but was in 1840 acquired for use in smuggling. It is currently let as holiday accommodation.

Smuggling

In 2002 Operation Eyeful resulted in a large seizure of cocaine and the arrests of Michael Tyrrell, Julie Paterson and Frederick Fillingham and others by officers from HM Customs & Excise. Most of the arrests were made by officers based at HM Customs Shoreham Office, the combined prison sentence of the eight involved is 141 years of prison.

References

Bays of the Isle of Wight